Frank Opsal (18 November 1928 – 5 April 2008) was a Canadian sports shooter. He competed in the trap event at the 1956 Summer Olympics.

References

1928 births
2008 deaths
Canadian male sport shooters
Olympic shooters of Canada
Shooters at the 1956 Summer Olympics
Sportspeople from Vancouver
20th-century Canadian people